Stadion Spartak is a multi-purpose stadium in Varna, Bulgaria.

It is currently used mostly for football games and is the home ground of FC Spartak Varna. The stadium was built in 1962 and opened in 1964, with capacity of 6,000 people. The stadium includes also fan bar-cafe and modern artificial fields. It is located not far from the city center.

International matches
UEFA Intertoto Cup

June 22/23 1996 - PFC Spartak Varna 2-1 TSV 1860 München 
July 6/7 1996 - PFC Spartak Varna 0-1 Kaucuk Opava 
June 28/29 1997 - PFC Spartak Varna 0-2 F.C. Groningen 
July 12/13 1997 - PFC Spartak Varna 1-1 Montpellier HSC 
June 1998 - PFC Spartak Varna 1-1 Baltika Kaliningrad 
July 1999 - PFC Spartak Varna 1-2 K. Sint-Truidense V.V. 
24 June 2001 - PFC Spartak Varna 4-0 Dyskobolia Grodzisk 
1 July 2001 - PFC Spartak Varna 2-0 Tavriya Simferopol

Gallery

External links
 The Spartak Stadium at StadiumDB.com

References

Official club site

Multi-purpose stadiums in Bulgaria
Football venues in Bulgaria
Sports venues in Varna, Bulgaria
PFC Spartak Varna